Simon "Ding" Archer is an English musician and producer from Manchester. He is a current member of 1919 and Red Lorry Yellow Lorry, and a past member of The Fall and PJ Harvey. He is owner-operator of 6DB Studios in Salford.

History

The Fall 
Archer joined seminal Manchester post-punk group The Fall in March 2003 as a bass guitarist, replacing Jim Watts. He left in April 2004 and was replaced by Steve Trafford. Archer had been occasionally involved in some capacity before he joined, and continued to do so for the remainder of their active years as musical contributor, backing vocalist or recording engineer.

 The Real New Fall LP (2003) – one track only
 "(We Wish You) A Protein Christmas" (2003)
 "Theme from Sparta F.C. #2" (2004)
 Fall Heads Roll (2005) – three tracks only
 The Remainderer (2013)

PJ Harvey 
Archer was a touring member of PJ Harvey's band in 2004. The 'Un Huh Her' tour, featuring Archer, became the 2006 live documentary Please Leave Quietly.

The Pixies 
Archer replaced Kim Deal on bass for The Pixies' 2014 album Indie Cindy.

Other work 
Archer played Sex Pistols bassist Glen Matlcok in Michael Winterbottom's 2002 film 24 Hour Party People.

References 

1966 births
Living people
English male musicians
English record producers
Musicians from Manchester